Rubin Hebaj (born 30 July 1998) is an Albanian professional footballer who plays as a forward for Uzbekistan Super League club Andijon.

Club career

Early career
Hebaj started his youth career at age of 14 with Vllaznia in September 2012 and was placed in under-15 team. With under-15 side Hebaj won the National Regional Championship and was voted as the best player of the tournament. After spending one season with under-15 he advanced in other youth teams of Vllaznia. During the 2016–17 season he played for Vllaznia B in the Kategoria e Dytë, scoring two goals in three matches.

Vllaznia
He made his debut with the Vllaznia first team under the coach Armir Grimaj in the 2015–16 Albanian Cup match against Apolonia on 28 October 2015 in a goalless draw, coming on as a substitute in the 70th minute in place of Santiago Martinez.

Domžale
On 22 June 2017, Hebaj moved for the first time aboard by joining Slovenian team Domžale on a three-year contract. He made his debut on 30 July 2017 against Ankaran in the third game week, coming on as a substitute in the 58th minute in place of Matija Rom. He scored his first goal on 27 August 2017 against Krško in his third match played. In the contest, Hebaj provided the assist for Alen Ožbolt's equalising goal and, minutes later, scored himself for the 2–1 lead. However, Krško managed to win the game with a score of 4–2.

Loan to Partizani
On 27 July 2018, Partizani reached an agreement with Domžale for the services of Hebaj on a one-year loan; his salary will be paid by his parent club. He was presented the following day, receiving the squad number 9. He endured a difficult first part of the season, spending the time between bench and the pitch. However, he proved to be decisive in the capital derby against Tirana, as he came from the bench to score a brace, his first league goals, to help the team overturn the result and win 2–1 to maintain the championship lead.

Teuta
On 21 January 2020, Hebaj returned to Kategoria Superiore by inking a six-month contract with Teuta. He made his debut on 2 February in the 2–1 away loss to Tirana, and scored his first goal in the 5–1 away win against Luftëtari on 20 June.

He concluded the second half of 2019–20 season with two goals from 15 league appearances. On 31 August, Hebaj scored a brace in the 2–1 win against Tirana at Elbasan Arena for the 2020 Albanian Supercup, giving Teuta its first silverware of the new season.

However, Hebaj underperformed in the league, recording only one goal in 11 appearances in the first half of the season, which lead the club to terminate his contract by mutual consent.

Shkëndija
In January 2021, following his release by Teuta, Hebaj joined KF Shkëndija in North Macedonia on a two-and-a-half contract.

Return to Teuta
On 4 January 2022, Teuta announced to have resigned Hebaj for an undisclosed fee.

International career

Albania U17
Hebaj was called up by Albania under-17 team coach Džemal Mustedanagić to participate in the 2015 UEFA European Under-17 Championship qualification where Albania was placed in Group 9. He made his debut on 8 October in the first match against Norway where he appeared as a second-half substitute in an eventual 3–0 defeat. He went on to play in the remaining two matches as Albania failed to pass the group, finishing in third position.

Albania U19
In November 2015, Hebaj was called to the under-19s by the coach Arjan Bellaj for the 2016 UEFA European Under-19 Championship qualification. He managed to play in all three matches in Group 8, as Albania was eliminated in the process, finishing third.

Albania U20
He received his first call up for the Albania under-20 side by Alban Bushi for the friendly match against Georgia U20 on 14 November 2017. He debuted for under-20 team against Georgia playing the full 90-minutes match, finished in a 3–0 loss.

Albania U21
Hebaj received the first call-up at under-21 squad by coach Redi Jupi for the closing 2017 UEFA European Under-21 Championship qualification match against Israel on 10 October 2016. However, he was an unused substitute as Albania was defeated 4–0.

Hebaj was called up by coach Alban Bushi for the friendly against France on 5 June 2017 and the 2019 UEFA European Under-21 Championship qualification opening match against Estonia one week later. He made his competitive debut on 5 June 2017 coming on as a substitute of a 3–0 home defeat to France.

Hebaj scored his first goals for under-21 side in November 2018 in a double friendly against Malta; he scored and won a penalty kick in the first match at Selman Stërmasi Stadium on 16th which was won 2–0, while three days later scored a brace at Loro Boriçi Stadium in another Albania win.

Career statistics

Club

References

External links

 

1998 births
Living people
Footballers from Shkodër
Albanian footballers
Association football forwards
Albania youth international footballers
Albania under-21 international footballers
Kategoria Superiore players
Slovenian PrvaLiga players
Ukrainian Premier League players
Macedonian First Football League players
KF Vllaznia Shkodër players
NK Domžale players
FK Partizani Tirana players
FC Vorskla Poltava players
KF Teuta Durrës players
KF Shkëndija players
Albanian expatriate footballers
Albanian expatriate sportspeople in Slovenia
Expatriate footballers in Slovenia
Albanian expatriate sportspeople in Ukraine
Expatriate footballers in Ukraine
Albanian expatriate sportspeople in North Macedonia
Expatriate footballers in North Macedonia